Domenico de' Rossi (1659–1730) was an Italian sculptor and engraver. 

In 1709 Domenico inherited the printshop of Giovanni Giacomo de' Rossi, by the church of Santa Maria della Pace, the largest and most long-lived publisher of the Roman baroque. Several generations of the de' Rossi participated in the family publishing firm established in the 17th century, which continued to produce engravings for the use of designers .

Publications
He is especially remembered for the three folio volumes of architectural engravings of elevations and frontal views of Baroque palazzi and churches in Rome, which included among them some unexecuted designs of Bernini and Borromini, and which were titled "Studio d'architettura civile di Roma 1702, 1711, and 1721. The first volume, showing a wide variety of designs of windows, doors and gates, porticos and porches, chimney pieces and stairs, and dedicated to Pope Clement XI, was engraved for Rossi by quite a large team: Alessandro Specchi, Filippo Vasoni, Carlo Fontana, Vinzendo Francischini, and others. De' Rossi also produced a book of designs for altars and chapels, Disegni di Vari Altari e Cappelle, 1685.  The series of engravings were some of the first to present the contemporary baroque decoration of 17th-century Rome, thus they are of interest to architectural historians and were reprinted with an introductory essay by Anthony Blunt, 1972.

When he published a collection of engravings of ancient and modern Roman sculpture, Raccolta di statue antiche e moderne (Rome, 1704), he turned to the well-known antiquarian Paolo Alessandro Maffei for suitably learned descriptive text, for what was in effect the first eighteenth-century art book, whose refined engravings by French artists were designed to appeal to the cognoscenti.

The complete titles of Domenico de' Rossi's volumes:
Studio d'architettura civile sopra gli ornamenti di porte e finestre tatti da alcune fabbriche insigni di Roma con le misure piante modini, e profili. Opera de piu celebri architetti de nostri tempi, Rome, 1702. Dedicated to Clement XI
Studio d'architettura civile sopra varj ornamenti di cappelle, e diversi sepolcri tratti da più chiese di Roma colle loro facciate, fianchi, piante, e misure. Opera de' più celebri architetti de' nostri tempi, Rome, 1711. Dedicated to Cardinal Francesco Acquaviva d'Aragona
Studio d'architettura civili sopra varie chiese, cappelle di Roma, e palazzo di Caprarola, et altre fabriche con le loro facciate, spaccati, piante, e misure. Opera de' piu celebri architetti de' nostri tempi, Rome, 1721. Dedicated to Cardinal Bernardino Scotto.

Notes

External links 
Engravings by various artists from Domenico de' Rossi, Studio d'architettura civile 
Details of Studio d'architettura civile 
Columbia University: Joseph Connors, Francesco Borromini: Opus Architectonicum, Milan, 1998: bibliography, including material by the de' Rossi.

Further reading
Simona Ciofetta, "Lo Studio d'Architettura Civile edito da Domenico De Rossi (1702, 1711, 1721)," in Urbe Architectus, pp. 214–228
Francesca Consagra, "De Rossi and Falda: A Successful Collaboration in the Print Industry of Seventeenth-Century Rome," in A. Ladis and C. Wood, eds., The Craft of Art: Originality and Industry in the Italian Renaissance and Baroque Workshop, Athens, Georgia, 1995,  pp. 187–203.

1659 births
1730 deaths
18th-century Italian architects